Michael Conway may refer to:

Michael Conway (Emmerdale), a fictional character from the British soap opera Emmerdale
Michael Conway (hurler), hurler with the Kerry county team
Michael Conway (Irish senator), Irish senator in 1938
Michael Conway (politician) (1844–?), Irish nationalist politician and teacher
Michael Conway (rowing) (born 1953), Canadian Olympic coxswain
Mike Conway (American football), American football coach
Mike Conway (born 1983), racing driver
Michael Conway (British Army officer), Director General of the Army Legal Services Branch
Micky Conway (born 1956), English footballer

See also
Michael Conway Baker (born 1937), Canadian composer and music educator